Henryk Borowski (14 February 1910 in Płock - 13 November 1991 in Warsaw) was a Polish theater, radio and film actor.

Filmography

Notes and references

External links 
 
 Henryk Borowski at the Filmpolski Database . Retrieved 2015-02-28.
 Henryk Borowski WIEM Encyclopedia . Retrieved 2015-02-28.

1910 births
1991 deaths
Polish male stage actors
Polish male film actors
Polish male radio actors
20th-century Polish male actors
Male actors from Warsaw
People from Płock
Recipients of the Order of Polonia Restituta (1944–1989)
Recipient of the Meritorious Activist of Culture badge